Chandrapal Singh is an Indian politician who is serving as Member of 18th Uttar Pradesh Legislative Assembly from Debai Assembly constituency. In 2022 Uttar Pradesh Legislative Assembly election, he won with 1,28,640 votes.

References 

Uttar Pradesh MLAs 2022–2027
Bharatiya Janata Party politicians from Uttar Pradesh
Living people
Uttar Pradesh Legislative Assembly
Year of birth missing (living people)